Hinton Healthcare Centre is a medical facility located in Hinton, Alberta. Alberta Health Services is responsible for the operations of the hospital. They operate 23 beds.

Services
Day surgery    
Diagnostic imaging - on site radiologist
Emergency 
Hemodialysis (Visiting)
Inpatient care
Laboratory
Obstetrics
Visiting specialist care

References 

Hospitals in Alberta
Hinton, Alberta